Michael Hugh McKay (born 17 May 1964) is a retired Jamaican cyclist who competed for Jamaica at the 1992 Summer Olympics in the Men's Individual Road Race.

References

1964 births
Living people
Jamaican male cyclists
Olympic cyclists of Jamaica
Cyclists at the 1992 Summer Olympics
Place of birth missing (living people)